Cascadia and Cascadian are terms that derive from the Cascade Range and may refer to:

Places 
 Cascadia, Oregon
 Tehaleh, Washington, formerly known as Cascadia
 Cascadia State Park
 Diocese of Cascadia

Regional 
 Cascadia Channel, a deep-sea channel in the Pacific Ocean
 Cascadia (region) or Pacific Northwest, a region of North America
 Cascadia (bioregion), the environmental interactivity of the Pacific Northwest of North America
 Cascadia movement, a bioregional movement based within the Cascadia bioregion of the Pacific Northwest of North America
 Cascadia subduction zone, a convergent plate boundary that separates the Juan de Fuca and North America plates

Other uses 
 Cascadia (board game), by Randy Flynn and Shawn Stankewich
 Cascadian (horse), a racehorse
 Cascadian (train), a named train of the Great Northern Railway (U.S.) on its route between Seattle and Spokane, Washington
 Cascadia Code, a monospaced font from Microsoft
 Freightliner Cascadia, a semi truck
  METAtropolis: Cascadia, a science fiction story collection  audiobook
 Cascadia, a former plant genus now included in Saxifraga
 Cascadia, the codename of Windows Terminal
 Cascadia, a fictional country in the video game Project Wingman

See also
 Acadia
 Cascada (disambiguation)
 Cascade (disambiguation)
 1700 Cascadia earthquake, a magnitude 8.7 to 9.2 megathrust earthquake that occurred in the Cascadia subduction zone on January 26, 1700